is a former Japanese football player.

Playing career
Noda was born in Sagamihara on October 6, 1981. After graduating from high school, he joined J1 League club Verdy Kawasaki (later Tokyo Verdy) in 2000. However he could not play at all in the match behind Kenji Honnami and Shinkichi Kikuchi in 2 seasons. In 2002, he moved to Regional Leagues club Okinawa Kariyushi FC. In 2003, he moved to new club FC Ryukyu in Prefectural Leagues. The club was promoted to Regional Leagues from 2005 and Japan Football League from 2006. He played as regular goalkeeper until 2007. However his opportunity to play decreased behind Raïs M'Bolhi in 2008. In 2009, he moved to J2 League club FC Gifu. He played many matches until 2010. However his opportunity to play decreased from 2011 and he retired end of 2012 season.

Club statistics

References

External links

1981 births
Living people
Association football people from Kanagawa Prefecture
Japanese footballers
J1 League players
J2 League players
Japan Football League players
Tokyo Verdy players
FC Ryukyu players
FC Gifu players
Association football goalkeepers